Major General Walter Patrick Hore-Ruthven, 10th Lord Ruthven of Freeland, 2nd Baron Ruthven of Gowrie,  (6 June 1870 – 16 April 1956), known as Master of Ruthven from 1870 to 1921, was a senior British Army officer. He served as Major-General commanding the Brigade of Guards and General Officer Commanding London District from 1924 to 1928, and was then Lieutenant Governor of Guernsey until 1934.

Early life
Ruthven was the son of Walter James Hore-Ruthven, 9th Lord Ruthven of Freeland, 1st Baron Ruthven of Gowrie, and of his wife Lady Caroline Annesley Gore, a daughter of Philip Gore, 4th Earl of Arran. He was educated at Eton College.

Military career
In 1887, aged seventeen, Hore-Ruthven was commissioned as a second lieutenant into the 3rd (Militia) battalion of the Argyll and Sutherland Highlanders. On 25 July 1891 he transferred to regular service in the Scots Guards, was promoted to lieutenant on 12 February 1896 and to captain on 11 October 1899. He served in the Second Boer War and took part in the Battle of Magersfontein on 10–11 December 1899, in which a defending Boer force defeated the advancing British forces with heavy casualties for the latter. He was mentioned in the despatch from Lord Methuen describing the battle. On 1 January 1902, he was appointed regimental Adjutant of the Scots Guards.

Ruthven later served in the First World War. He succeeded as 2nd Baron Ruthven of Gowrie and as 10th Lord Ruthven of Freeland in 1921.

After the war he became Commander of the Bangalore Brigade in India and in 1924 he was appointed Major-General commanding the Brigade of Guards and General Officer Commanding London District. In 1929 he was made Lieutenant Governor of Guernsey. He retired in 1935.

Personal life
In 1895, Ruthven married Jean Leslie Lampson, a granddaughter of Curtis Lampson, and they had four children:

 Bridget Helen Hore-Ruthven, 11th Lady Ruthven of Freeland (1896–1982); who married firstly George Howard, 11th Earl of Carlisle and later remarried Walter Monckton, 1st Viscount Monckton of Brenchley. With her first husband, she had three children: 
 Hon Jean Elizabeth St. Loe Hore-Ruthven (1898–1960); married, no issue
 Hon Alison Mary Hore-Ruthven (1902–1974); married Commander Sir John Leighton Barran, 3rd Baronet, had issue
 Hon Margaret Leslie Hore-Ruthven (1902–1970); married Peter Llewelyn Davies, had issue

After Jean Lampson's death in 1952, Lord Ruthven remarried Judith Gordon Bell.

Titles
Lord Ruthven's surname and title originated from his Irish great-grandfather Walter Hore's marriage to Scottish noblewoman Mary Ruthven, Lady Ruthven of Freeland. Walter legally changed his surname to Hore-Ruthven.
The Master of Ruthven (1870–1921)
Major General the Lord Ruthven of Freeland CB CMG DSO (1921–1956)

As his more senior title was in the Peerage of Scotland and may be inherited by female descendants.  It has been held since 1994 by his great-grandson George Howard, 13th Earl of Carlisle, grandson of Bridget Monckton, 11th Lady Ruthven of Freeland. The junior title Baron Ruthven of Gowrie may only pass through male descendants and has been held since November 2021 by his great-great-nephew (Patrick Leo) Brer Ruthven, 3rd Earl of Gowrie.

References

External links
 

|-

|-

|-

1870 births
1956 deaths
British Army generals of World War I
British Army personnel of the Second Boer War
Argyll and Sutherland Highlanders officers
Companions of the Order of the Bath
Companions of the Order of St Michael and St George
Companions of the Distinguished Service Order
Scots Guards officers
British Army major generals
10
Barons Ruthven of Gowrie